Black Ivory Coffee is a brand of coffee produced by the Black Ivory Coffee Company Ltd in northern Thailand from Arabica coffee beans consumed by elephants and collected from their waste. The taste of Black Ivory coffee is influenced by elephants' digestive enzymes, which breaks down the coffee's protein. The company claims to rescue elephants from tourist trade abuse.

Availability 
Black Ivory Coffee is among the world's most expensive coffees, at US$2,000 per kilogram. The producer sells the coffee to select luxury hotels, where it is sold at US$50 per cup. The coffee can also be purchased online. The coffee product in 2021 was 215kg. The supply of Black Ivory coffee depends on the availability of coffee cherries, the appetite of the elephants, the number of beans destroyed through chewing of the beans and the ability of the mahouts and their wives to recover intact beans. The high price of the product is largely due to the large number of coffee cherries needed to produce the finished product: 33 kilograms (72 pounds) of raw coffee cherries results in one kilogram (2.2 pounds) of the finished product. Most of the beans are not recoverable as they are chewed by the elephants, become fragmented, or are lost in the bush after being excreted.

Golden Triangle Asian Elephant Foundation
This coffee was first produced by Black Ivory Coffee Co. Ltd. at the Golden Triangle Asian Elephant Foundation in Chiang Saen, an elephant refuge that cares for rescued elephants.  Now, Black Ivory Coffee no longer produces in the Golden Triangle but in Surin province in north east Thailand. Approximately 20 elephants at the foundation produce the coffee. Eight percent of Black Ivory Coffee Company sales are donated to the Golden Triangle Asian Elephant Foundation, which is used to fund the elephants' health care. The consumption of the coffee cherries does not adversely affect the elephants, and veterinary tests concluded that caffeine is not absorbed from the coffee cherries they consume.

See also

 Kopi luwak
 List of delicacies

References

Coffee brands
Food and drink companies of Thailand
Agriculture in Thailand
Thai drink brands
Foods and drinks produced with excrement